Orankesee is a lake in Berlin, Germany.

Lakes of Berlin
Lichtenberg